Lake Rotongaro is located to the west of Ohinewai in the Waikato Region of New Zealand. It is a large shallow riverine lake, which links to the Waikato River. It is situated between the Waikato River and the larger Lake Whangape.

The lake has a single outflow which drains into Lake Rotongaroiti, which then flows through the Rotongaro canal, then on into the Lake Whangape outlet (via a floodgate structure) before it reaches the Waikato River.

The lake area is approximately 292 ha, with a max depth of 3.3 m. The catchment area is predominantly pastoral, with an estimated area of 1950 ha.

Etymology
In Māori, rotongaro means "hidden lake" (roto = lake, ngaro = hidden).

See also 
 List of lakes of New Zealand

References

External links 
https://www.waikatoregion.govt.nz/environment/natural-resources/water/lakes/where-are-our-lakes/

Lakes of Waikato
Waikato District